The People's Republic of the Congo was a Marxist–Leninist socialist state that existed in the Republic of the Congo from 1969 to 1992.

The People's Republic of the Congo was founded in December 1969 as the first Marxist-Leninist state in Africa three months after the government of Alphonse Massamba-Débat was overthrown in the September 1968 coup d'état. The ruling Congolese Party of Labour (PCT) appointed Marien Ngouabi as president who established the Congo as a one-party communist government aligned with the Soviet Union. Ngouabi was assassinated in 1977 and succeeded by Joachim Yhombi-Opango until he was overthrown in 1979. Denis Sassou Nguesso succeeded Yhombi-Opango, confirmed the PCT's rule in the Congo with a new constitution, formed closer relations with France, and allowed greater foreign investment in the country. The People's Republic of the Congo transitioned into a capitalist multi-party democracy following the dissolution of the Soviet Union in 1991, restoring the country's earlier name and flag, and ceased to exist by March 1992. André Milongo was appointed as transitional prime minister while Sassou remained as president.

Demographics 

The People's Republic of the Congo had 2,153,685 inhabitants in 1988. There were 15 ethnic groups, although most people were Kongo, Sangha, M'Bochi, or Teke. 8,500 Europeans were present as well, mostly of French extraction. French was the official language, but other recognized languages included Kituba and Lingala. Most of the population was centered in urban areas such as Brazzaville. Literacy was 80%, but infant mortality was also high.

History

Background 
Alphonse Massamba-Débat, who became the president of the Republic of the Congo in 1963, was the first African head of state who proclaimed himself openly a Marxist. He established a single-party system in 1964 around his own political group, the National Revolution Movement (Mouvement National de la Révolution). Massamba-Débat was elected Secretary General of the National Revolution Movement while Ambroise Noumazalaye became its First Secretary. The Congolese single party was backed by a well-armed popular militia, the Défense Civile, headed by Ange Diawara. However, by 1968 mounting protests led Massamba-Débat to imprison one of its leaders, Captain Marien Ngouabi.

Proclamation 
Seeing that the militant leftist opposition was not giving up, Massamba-Débat ended up yielding and proclaimed an amnesty, freeing Marien Ngouabi, among other political prisoners in mid-1968. Following the amnesty Massamba-Débat relinquished his power in September giving way to a period of instability. Finally on 31 December 1968 Marien Ngouabi became the head of state. The new leader officially proclaimed a socialist-oriented state in the form of a "Popular Republic" on 31 December 1969. The administration became strongly centralized in Brazzaville and the main government posts were taken over by Congolese Workers' Party—Parti congolais du travail (PCT)—cadres after abolishing the national assembly of the previous republic. The Marxist–Leninist PCT held a constitutive congress in the capital from 29 to 31 December 1969, becoming the sole party of the new state. Marien Ngouabi further introduced a number of communist policies—such as nationalizing the means of production—in the succeeding years. Ngouabi was assassinated in 1977 and was succeeded by colonel Joachim Yhombi-Opango, who ruled until February 1979, when Denis Sassou-Nguesso rose to power.

In the same manner as other African communist states of the Cold War era, the People's Republic of the Congo shared close ties with the Soviet Union. This association remained strong after Ngouabi's assassination in 1977. However, the PCT government also maintained a close relationship with France throughout its existence.

Transition 
In mid-1991, the Sovereign National Conference removed the word populaire ("People's") from the country's official name, while also replacing the flag and anthem that had been used under the PCT government. The Sovereign National Conference ended the PCT government, appointing a transitional Prime Minister, André Milongo, who was invested with executive powers. President Denis Sassou Nguesso was allowed to remain in office in a ceremonial capacity during the transitional period.

Events and emblems

See also 
 Cold War § Competition in the Third World

References

External links
 

States and territories established in 1969
States and territories disestablished in 1992
1969 establishments in Africa
1992 disestablishments in Africa
History of the Republic of the Congo
Communism in the Republic of the Congo
Communist states
Congo